Pseudopharus hades is a moth in the family Erebidae first described by Paul Dognin in 1909. It is found in Colombia.

References

Phaegopterina
Arctiinae of South America
Moths described in 1909